The 83rd Guards Air Assault Brigade is an airborne brigade of the Russian Airborne Troops, first formed in 1986. It is currently based in Ussuriysk.

History

Soviet era
The brigade traces its history back to the formation of the 65th Separate Air Assault Battalion in Białogard from the 126th Separate Guards Reconnaissance Battalion of the 6th Guards Motor Rifle Division in November 1985, part of the Northern Group of Forces. Between May and November 1986, the battalion was expanded to form the 83rd Separate Air Assault Brigade under the command of Colonel V.M. Sinitsyn. The brigade participated in the "Druzhba-86" exercises of Warsaw Pact troops. In 1988, after Soviet Ministry of Defense inspections, the brigade had the best results out of the Northern Group of Forces. The brigade won a Krasnaya Zvezda contest involving a 10 kilometer forced march in 1989. On 18 May 1990, the brigade was subordinated directly to the commander of the VDV and was reorganized as the 83rd Separate Airborne Brigade. The brigade was transferred to Ussuriysk in the Far Eastern Military District during July.

Russian Troops
On 1 February 1996, the brigade was detached from the Russian Airborne Troops and subordinated to the Far Eastern Military District. In a 2002 exercise, the brigade successfully cooperated with Naval Infantry at Cape Klerk southwest of Vladivostok, earning it compliments from the Minister of Defence Sergei Ivanov. From 22 June 2004, the brigade participated in the exercise "Mobilnost-2004". In fall 2006, the brigade was given the banner of the Military Council. On 1 December 2013, the brigade was transferred to the Russian Airborne Troops. It was awarded Guards status on 25 March 2015.

2022 Ukraine
In 2022, the brigade reportedly took part in the Russian invasion of Ukraine. According to Ukrainian state media, its deputy commander, Lieutenant Colonel Vitaliy Slabtsov, was killed in action during the invasion.

In July 2022 the website of the National Resistance Center of Ukraine reported that it had received large amounts of information from a source within the brigade. The NRC published personal data like passports and certificates, as well as some military documents, including classified data like organization charts, personnel lists, phone numbers, and addresses.

On May 21, 2022, VDV Major Vladimir Chilin, who previously served in Syria, was killed in Ukraine and later buried in Ryazan. Chilin reportedly was the deputy commander of a battalion in the 83rd Air Assault Brigade.

Composition 
In 1996, the brigade was composed of the following units.
 598th Airborne Battalion
 635th Airborne Battalion
 654th Airborne Battalion
 9th Guards Artillery Battalion

The structure of the brigade has been unclear; it has incorporated a tank battalion in the past.

References 

Airborne infantry brigades of Russia
Military units and formations established in 1986